Pickled Egg Records is a UK independent record label founded in Leicester in 1998 by Nigel Turner. Distribution is through Cargo.

Artists on Pickled Egg
 a.P.A.t.T.
 Bablicon
 Big Eyes
 Butchy Fuego
 Chandeliers
 The Doozer
 The Evolution Control Committee
 Farina
 Freeze Puppy
 Fulborn Teversham
 George
 The Go! Team
 Hassle Hound
 Daniel Johnston
 leBLEU
 Marshmallow Coast
 Nalle
 Need New Body
 Now
 Oddfellows Casino
 Pop-Off Tuesday
 Scatter
 Volcano The Bear
 Zukanican
 100 Pets

See also
 List of record labels

External links
Official website
Leicester Band's website

British independent record labels
Record labels established in 1998
Alternative rock record labels